The Kabirpanthi Julaha are a Sikh, Hindu and Muslim caste found in North India. They are followers of Kabirdas. 

They are classified as a Scheduled Caste in Haryana, Punjab, Himachal Pradesh and Uttar Pradesh.

References 

Hindu communities
Scheduled Castes of Haryana
Scheduled Castes of Himachal Pradesh
Scheduled Castes of Uttar Pradesh
Weaving communities of South Asia